Natalie Radford (born 24 June 1966) is a Canadian actress. She has acted in various television shows and movies, including Darcy's Wild Life and Jewel.

Filmography

Film

Television

References

External links 
 

1966 births
Living people
Canadian film actresses
Canadian television actresses